Neocybium is an extinct genus of prehistoric perciform fish.

See also

 Prehistoric fish
 List of prehistoric bony fish

References

Prehistoric perciform genera
Oligocene fish
Fossils of Germany
Prehistoric fish of Europe